The men's double regu sepak takraw competition at the 2006 Asian Games in Doha was held from 11 December to 13 December at the Al-Sadd Indoor Hall.

Squads

Results 
All times are Arabia Standard Time (UTC+03:00)

Preliminary

Group A

|-
|11 December||09:00
|align=right|
|align=center|2–0
|align=left|
|21–14||21–8||
|-
|11 December||10:00
|align=right|
|align=center|0–2
|align=left|
|16–21||11–21||
|-
|11 December||14:00
|align=right|
|align=center|0–2
|align=left|
|19–21||18–21||
|-
|11 December||15:00
|align=right|
|align=center|2–0
|align=left|
|21–9||21–15||
|-
|11 December||18:00
|align=right|
|align=center|0–2
|align=left|
|14–21||19–21||
|-
|12 December||09:00
|align=right|
|align=center|2–1
|align=left|
|21–15||17–21||15–13
|-
|12 December||10:00
|align=right|
|align=center|2–0
|align=left|
|21–19||23–21||
|-
|12 December||14:00
|align=right|
|align=center|2–0
|align=left|
|25–23||21–10||
|-
|12 December||15:00
|align=right|
|align=center|2–0
|align=left|
|21–8||21–11||
|-
|12 December||18:00
|align=right|
|align=center|1–2
|align=left|
|21–16||14–21||12–15

Group B

|-
|11 December||09:00
|align=right|
|align=center|2–1
|align=left|
|15–21||23–21||15–9
|-
|11 December||10:00
|align=right|
|align=center|0–2
|align=left|
|15–21||16–21||
|-
|11 December||14:00
|align=right|
|align=center|2–0
|align=left|
|21–15||21–15||
|-
|11 December||15:00
|align=right|
|align=center|2–1
|align=left|
|21–18||17–21||17–15
|-
|11 December||19:00
|align=right|
|align=center|2–0
|align=left|
|21–7||21–15||
|-
|12 December||09:00
|align=right|
|align=center|2–1
|align=left|
|21–14||14–21||15–11
|-
|12 December||10:00
|align=right|
|align=center|0–2
|align=left|
|11–21||12–21||
|-
|12 December||14:00
|align=right|
|align=center|0–2
|align=left|
|14–21||18–21||
|-
|12 December||15:00
|align=right|
|align=center|0–2
|align=left|
|18–21||15–21||
|-
|12 December||18:00
|align=right|
|align=center|0–2
|align=left|
|13–21||16–21||

Knockout round

Semifinals

|-
|13 December||11:00
|align=right|
|align=center|2–1
|align=left|
|21–16||23–25||15–12
|-
|13 December||13:00
|align=right|
|align=center|2–0
|align=left|
|21–18||25–24||

Final

|-
|13 December||17:00
|align=right|
|align=center|0–2
|align=left|
|17–21||15–21||

References 

Official Website
Results

Sepak takraw at the 2006 Asian Games